KIEF-LP (101.5 FM) is a radio station licensed to serve the community of Three Forks, Montana. The station is owned by Church of the Hard Rock. It airs a variety radio format.

The station was assigned the KIEF-LP call letters by the Federal Communications Commission on January 24, 2014.

References

External links
 Official Website
 

IEF-LP
IEF-LP
Radio stations established in 2014
2014 establishments in Montana
Variety radio stations in the United States
Three Forks, Montana